The University of Missouri College of Education is the education college at University of Missouri in Columbia, Missouri. The school is composed of five academic departments offering doctoral, graduate and undergraduate programs both on campus and online. Founded in 1867 as the state normal school, MU was one of the first state universities in the country to undertake the professional training of teachers as a regular part of its collegiate work. In 2019, the college was ranked 36th out of 392 education schools by U.S. News & World Report. Among U.S. News & World Report Best Graduate Programs, the college was ranked #3 for student counseling and personnel services, #21 for special education, and #22 for library and information studies.

Departments 
 Department of Educational Leadership & Policy Analysis
 Department of Educational, School & Counseling Psychology 
 Department of Learning, Teaching & Curriculum
 School of Information Science & Learning Technologies
 Department of Special Education

References

External links

A history of the MU College of Education

University of Missouri
Schools of education in Missouri
1867 establishments in Missouri
University subdivisions in Missouri